IF Vallentuna BK is a sports club based in Vallentuna, Stockholm County, Sweden. Their ice hockey department, Vallentuna Hockey, played two seasons in the second-tier HockeyAllsvenskan, from 2002–2004.  The team now plays in the 1D group of third-tier Division 1.

External links
Official site of the hockey department
Vallentuna Hockey's profile on Eliteprospects.com

Ice hockey teams in Sweden
Ice hockey teams in Stockholm County